Livingstonia or Kondowe is a town located in the Northern Region district of Rumphi in Malawi.

History

Livingstonia was founded in 1894 by missionaries from the Free Church of Scotland. The missionaries had first established a mission in 1875 at Cape Maclear, which they named Livingstonia after David Livingstone, whose death in 1873 had rekindled British support for missions in Eastern Africa. The mission was linked with the Livingstonia Central Africa Company, set up as a commercial business in 1877. By 1881 Cape Maclear had proved extremely malarial and the mission moved north to Bandawe. This site also proved unhealthy and the Livingstonia Mission moved once again to the higher grounds between Lake Malawi and Nyika Plateau. This new site proved highly successful because Livingstonia is located in the mountains and therefore not prone to mosquitoes carrying malaria. The mission station gradually developed into a small town.

The leading missionary for 52 years was Robert Laws. He established the best school in the region at the time in Livingstonia, and its graduates became influential in several neighbouring countries, including South Africa. Among the alumni of the school was writer Legson Kayira, who graduated in 1958. The title of his autobiographical work I Will Try was taken from the school motto. 

Laws wanted Livingstonia to develop into a University, but his successors did not pursue the dream. In 2003 the Livingstonia Synod of the Church of Central Africa, Presbyterian (CCAP) renewed the vision and started Livingstonia University.

Facilities

The houses in Livingstonia are mostly constructed with red bricks. The Stone House, the original house of Robert Laws, is now a hotel. It also has a small museum about the history of Livingstonia.

Demographics
In 2008, the population of Livingstonia was 6,690.

Transportation
The roads to Livingstonia do not have any tarmac. The town is connected to Chitimba on Lake Malawi by the S103 (T305), a steep hillside road with multiple hairpin bends, while the T306 and T305 run to the south. Both roads are in poor condition.

Hospital

David Gordon Memorial Hospital had its foundation stone laid in 1910 and was opened in 1911. David Gondwe was Livingstonia's first formally trained hospital assistant. He was sacked as the mission administration discovered his polygamous marriage, and thought that rendered him "unstable". However, he was soon employed by the governmental Colonial Medical Services. The hospital currently serves a catchment area with a population of approximately 60,000.

Further reading
 Lonely Planet, Malawi, Mozambique and Zambia (1st Ed.).  1997. Lonely Planet Publications, Hawthorne, Australia.
 For the history of Livingstonia Mission and Synod see: John McCracken, Politics and Christianity in Malawi 1875-1940. The Impact of the Livingstonia Mission in the Northern Province, 2nd ed., Blantyre: CLAIM, 2000, 376 pp.

References

External links

Populated places in Northern Region, Malawi
Populated places established in 1894
David Livingstone